LG Optimus L2  is a slate smartphone designed and manufactured by LG Electronics. The Optimus L2 runs on Android 2.3 Gingerbread. The LG Optimus L2 is the budget-range handset in the L series.

Hardware
LG Optimus L2 comes with a dual-sim functionality, 800 MHz Single-Core Qualcomm MSM7225A CPU and Adreno 200 GPU. It has a 3.2 inch TFT  capacitive touch-screen, displaying 262,144 colours at QVGA resolution. On the front is the phone's single speaker.

See also
 LG Optimus
 List of LG mobile phones
 Comparison of smartphones

References
 LG Optimus L2 review|PCWorld.com.au http://www.pcworld.idg.com.au/review/lg/optimus_l2/433631/
 LG Optimus L2 E405 Specifications - http://www.umnet.com/phone/6593-LG_Optimus_L2

Android (operating system) devices
LG Electronics smartphones
Discontinued smartphones